Vriesea erythrodactylon is a plant species in the genus Vriesea. This species is endemic to Brazil.

Cultivars 
 Vriesea 'Fire Rose'
 Vriesea 'Perfidia'
 Vriesea 'Pink Cockatoo'
 Vriesea 'Purple Cockatoo'
 Vriesea 'Purple Haze'
 Vriesea 'Red Flame'
 Vriesea 'Rosa Morena'
 Vriesea 'Ruby Lee'
 Vriesea 'Stoplight'
 Vriesea 'Waggoner'
 Vriesea 'White Cloud'

References

BSI Cultivar Registry Retrieved 11 October 2009

BSI Genera Gallery photos

erythrodactylon
Flora of Brazil